The 2011 FA Women's Cup Final was the 41st final of the FA Women's Cup, England's primary cup competition for women's football teams. The showpiece event was the 18th to be played directly under the auspices of the Football Association (FA). The final was contested between Arsenal Ladies and Bristol Academy on 21 May 2011 at Ricoh Arena in Coventry. Holders Arsenal made its 11th final win.  The win cemented Arsenal's qualification for the 2011-12 UEFA Women's Champions League for the ninth time in 10 years. Midfielder Kim Little was named Player of the Match.

Details

References

External links
 The FA Women's Cup

Cup
Women's FA Cup finals
FA Women's Cup Final
FA Women's Cup Final, 2011
FA Women's Cup Final, 2011